The Iglesia gótico-mudéjar de Humanejos was a Gothic-Mudéjar church near Parla (city of Madrid). It was in Humanejos (or Umanexos, according to other spellings), a village of the former Council of City and Land of Madrid, whose origin probably dates back to the 11th or 12th century, when Christians repopulated the current Community of Madrid.

Humanejos 
At mid-14th century, this small village was about to disappear as a result of the Black Death. During the reign of the Catholic Monarchs, neighbors arrived from Parla, Pinto and Torrejón de la Calzada managed to revitalize it.

However, the place was not able to stay much longer. A document of 1651 shows that then only had three people and another of 1701 realizes its total depopulation.

Despite its demographic significance, Humanejos was endowed with this impressive church.

History 
It is unknown at what point the church could be erected, although its style and typology, it should understand that it was in the 14th or 15th centuries. This is the hypothesis that defends José Antonio Mateos, historian and official chronicler of Parla, in which municipality is the depopulated Humanejos.

It is also possible that it was built on a previous temple, as some authors, considering that its invocation, Saints Justus and Pastor, was very recurrent south of the current Community of Madrid during the Reconquista.

For its location about four hundred meters from the old Road of Toledo, the church became a meeting point for the many travelers passing through this route. This accelerated its deterioration, although it is conceivable that was the subject of intense looting, especially following the diffusion of the drawings by Villaamil in the 1840s.

In the 20th century there were only a few walls standing, which completely demolished in the 1980s for rose the today Autovía A-42.

Description of the building 
It was a building of great proportions, with striking the remarkable artistic quality of the trace, with a succession of polibulates arches, Gothic windows and horseshoe pointed arches surrounding the apse and a splendid triumphal arch, with bicolor dovelaje, to the Caliphate taste, in the chancel.

References 

Demolished buildings and structures in Madrid
Buildings and structures completed in the 14th century
Gothic architecture in the Community of Madrid
Mudéjar architecture in the Community of Madrid
Former religious buildings and structures in Spain
Buildings and structures demolished in the 20th century
1980s disestablishments in Spain
Parla